Transportation Research Part A: Policy and Practice is a bimonthly peer-reviewed scientific journal covering research on transportation policy and related issues. It was established in 1979 as Transportation Research Part A: General, obtaining its current name in 1992. The editors-in-chief are Juan de Dios Ortuzar (Pontificia Universidad Católica de Chile) and E. Cherchi (Newcastle University). According to the Journal Citation Reports, the journal has a 2018 impact factor of 3.693.

See also 
 Transportation Research Part D: Transport and Environment
 Transportation Research Part E: Logistics and Transportation Review

References

External links

Publications established in 1979
Elsevier academic journals
English-language journals